Sharaf bin Rajeh (1881–1955) was the regent of the Kingdom of Iraq from April of 1941 to June 1941, as well as a Jordanian senator and the Emir or Taif until his death. He, a distant relative of the previous regent Abdullah, was appointed under Rashid Ali al-Gaylani to legitimize Golden Square control of Iraq.

Biography 
Sharaf bin Rajeh was born in Taif in 1881 as the heir of the emirship, in what was then Ottoman Arabia. He participated in the conquest of Asir against the Ottoman authorities during the Arab Revolt. Around the same time, he became the Emir of Taif, succeeding his father. He continued participation in the conflict by raiding train stations. He would lead the capture of Medina following the surrender of the Ottomans. He later moved to Iraq in 1925, where he had his son Abdelhamid Sharaf. In Iraq, he became the second regent.
In 1950, he moved to Amman and served on the Jordanian senate from 1950 to 1955. He died in 1955.

As regent 
To prevent his constitutional power from being levied to support the Golden Square, in 1941 Abdullah fled the royal palace. After this, Rashid Ali al-Gaylani was looking to bring in a new regent. He therefore called forward the distant royal relative of Sharaf bin Rajeh to legitimize the government. Abdullah was then indicted in absentia for 'trying to undermine the army, for harming national unity and for flouting the constitution.' This new government was recognized by the Germans, but not the British.

References

Jordanian politicians
Emirs
Regents
People from Taif
1881 births

1955 deaths